Kallstenius is a surname of Swedish origin. People with that name include:

 Edvin Kallstenius (1881-1967), Swedish composer and librarian
 Gerda Roosval-Kallstenius (1864-1939), Swedish painter; wife of Gottfrid
 Gottfrid Kallstenius (1861-1943), Swedish painter; husband of Gerda

See also
 Björling–Kallstenius Expedition, an 1892 Swedish expedition which failed to reach the North Pole
 

Surnames of Swedish origin